Sopigino is a rural locality (a village) in Nikolotorzhskoye Rural Settlement, Kirillovsky District, Vologda Oblast, Russia. The population was 55 as of 2002.

Geography 
Sopigino is located 32 km northeast of Kirillov (the district's administrative centre) by road. Bragino is the nearest rural locality.

References 

Rural localities in Kirillovsky District